Ningthou Ching-Thang Khomba (also Rajarshi Bhagya Chandra, Jai Singh Maharaja) (1748–1799)  was a Meitei monarch of the 18th century CE. The inventor of the Manipuri Raas Leela dance, with his daughter Shija Lailoibi playing as Radha at the first performance, he is a popular figure in Manipur, and much of his actions as King had been mythologized. He is also credited with spreading Vaishnavism in Manipur State after his grandfather Pamheiba made Hinduism the official religion and for creating a unified Manipur.

Early years

Maharaja Bhagya Chandra ascended to the throne of Manipur in 1759, a few years after the death of his grandfather Pamheiba and his father Samjai Khurai-Lakpa at the hands of his uncle Chitsai. In 1762, Manipur was attacked by the Burmese, assisted by the Chitsai. He, along with the Rani (Queen) and a few loyal attendants fled to Ahom (modern-day Assam), where they lived under the protection of the Ahom ruler, Rajeswar Singha.

Life in Assam
Bhagya Chandra's crafty uncle wrote a letter to the Ahom king Rajeswar Singha saying that the person taking refuge at his court was not the true Bhagya Chandra. The uncle advised Rajeswar Singha to get rid of him. King Rajeswar Singha was somewhat persuaded by this letter and began treating Bhagya Chandra with suspicion.

In Meitei legends, the real Bhagya Chandra was said to have supernatural powers. To see whether the usurper was correct, King Rajeswar Singha designed a test at the behest of his court. In a public arena, Bhagya Chandra, while unarmed, was to catch and tame a wild elephant.

First epiphany
Confronted with insurmountable odds, King Bhagyachandra prayed to Lord Govinda (Krishna) for guidance. Govinda appeared to him in a dream and instructed him to enter the arena donning a garland while holding japa beads.  At the end of the instructions, Govinda assured him of victory.

The dream also stated that Bhagya Chandra would be the sole king of Manipur. Upon regaining the kingdom, he should install a Krishna murti. The Deity, Govinda, should be carved from a certain old jackfruit tree growing on the slopes of Kaina hill.

After installing the Deity, Govinda said the king should arrange for the performance of a Rasa-Lila, in which Krishna would be worshipped with song and dance. Bhagya Chandra also received in this vision a complete plan on how to execute the Ras Lila.

The test of power
Bhagya Chandra entered the arena, donning the garland and japa he was instructed to in the vision. In the ensuing fight, the spectators noted that the elephant seemed to recoil as if struck by a ghost. King Bhagya Chandra said that he saw "Lord Krishna as the mahout".

Retaking of Manipur

First expedition
After the duel, Bhagya Chandra appealed to Ahom king Rajeswar Singha for military assistance. Rajeswar Singha agreed to send an army to overthrow Chitsai and reinstate Bhagya Chandra. The expedition hit many snags in Nagaland where they were attacked by Naga tribesmen and poisonous snakes. Rajeswar Singha called off the unsuccessful venture in 1767.

Second expedition
In November 1768, Bhagya Chandra and Rajeswar Singha decided to make another attempt to invade Manipur. This time Bhagya Chandra led 10,000 Ahom troops across the Kachari kingdom to the Mirap river. Many battles ensued between the Ahoms and Meiteis on one side, and the Naga, Chitsai and the Burmese on the other. In 1773, Bhagya Chandra was reinstated as Ningthou of Manipur.

Dealings with the East India Company
In 1762, the British and Manipur signed a bilateral treaty with Gaurisiam, which spelled that the British and Meiteis would encourage trade and commerce. The British gave necessary help for protection against the Burmese and Naga. Manipur gave up a village for an East India Company post. The name "Manipur" (assigned by the British for Ching-Thang's kingdom)  for what was called "Meitrabak" came into being in 1774 when the Governor General of India Mr. Rendel, surveyed the area westward from Ningthi to Cachar and Northward from Chittagong to the Brahmaputra and renamed it.

Reign

In 1775 he established his capital at Bishenpur and carved the Govinda murti at the hill of Kaina. On 11 January 1779 he was "re-crowned" amid many performances of his now-popular Rasa Lila.

During his reign, the Meiteis repelled the Burmese from Manipur. Though his exploits, did not equal Pamheiba's, his reign was characterized by security. He was a great patron of the arts and religion, and his strong Manipuri Vaishnavism reflected on the Meiteis. He was an ardent devotee of Chaitanya Mahaprabhu and during his reign a statue of Nityananda was created.

In 1796 he moved his capital to Kangla and a year later on 5 February 1798  he abdicated the throne to his eldest son Labeinyachandra.  His last few years were on pilgrimage top various Vaisnavit holy sites, including Nabadwip. He died on 25 December 1798 in Murshidabad, West Bengal.

Family
Ching-Thang Khomba was son of Samjai Khurai-Lakpa, who had two brothers Mantri Ananda Shai and Chitsai. Ching-Thang had many siblings, the most famous of whom was Gaurisiam, King of Manipur until his death in 1763.

Cultural works
The tradition of Rasa Lila in Manipur is attributed to Ching-Thang. The first Manipur Maha Rasleela was performed in 1777. 

It was his daughter Shija Lailoibi, who first took the role of Radha in the Manipuri Raas Leela dance. Under the influence of Bengali missionaries, he also started the tradition of Sankirtan in Manipur.

Literary works
Laithok Laikha Jogi

References

1748 births
1799 deaths
Meitei royalty
Devotees of Krishna
Gaudiya religious leaders
Hindu monarchs